Taishir is a sum (district) of Govi-Altai Province in western Mongolia. In 2009, its population was 1,536.

References 

Districts of Govi-Altai Province
Populated places in Mongolia